Xenophrys glandulosa, the glandular horned toad or Jingdong spadefoot toad is a species of amphibian in the family Megophryidae found in Yunnan in China, in Nagaland in northeastern India, and in northern Kachin State, Myanmar. It has recently been reported from Bhutan. Its type locality is Mount Wuliang in Jingdong County, Yunnan.
Its natural habitats are tropical moist montane forests and rivers.

References

glandulosa
Amphibians of Bhutan
Amphibians of Myanmar
Amphibians of China
Frogs of India
Amphibians described in 1990